Lũng Cú is a commune of Dong Van District, Hà Giang Province, Vietnam. It is located at the northmost end of Vietnamese territory. Administratively, this sector includes 9 villages

References

Populated places in Hà Giang province